Rowland Whitehead may refer to:

Sir Rowland Whitehead, 3rd Baronet (1863–1942), British barrister and Liberal Party politician
Sir Rowland Whitehead, 5th Baronet (1930–2007), British baronet and merchant banker